Francis Mark is an American drummer, singer, guitarist, songwriter and artist known as a member of the bands From Autumn to Ashes, Warship, Biology, and Tidal Arms. Mark currently resides in Brooklyn, New York and plays with Tidal Arms. Before From Autumn To Ashes, he was in a local band named Who's to Blame with Scott Gross. Mark has also filled in for vocalist Jeffrey Moreira at a handful of Poison the Well shows in September 2001 and played drums for Reggie and the Full Effect in 2008.

Selected discography

with Tidal Arms 
 2013 – Tidal Arms
 2011 – The Sun Exploding

with Warship 
2008 – Supply and Depend (Vagrant Records)

with Biology 
 2005 – Making Moves (Vagrant Records)

with From Autumn to Ashes 
 2007 – Holding a Wolf by the Ears (Vagrant Records)
 2005 – Abandon Your Friends (Vagrant Records)
 2003 – The Fiction We Live (Vagrant Records)
 2001 – Too Bad You're Beautiful (Ferret Music)
 2000 – Sin, Sorrow, and Sadness (Tribunal Records)

References

External links
Francis Mark at Last.fm
Francis Mark at LinkedIn.com
Interview with Fran Mark
Fran Mark interviewed by PETA

American rock drummers
Living people
Year of birth missing (living people)
From Autumn to Ashes members
Biology (band) members
Poison the Well members